Francisco "Paco" Luis Canales (born 20 July 1957) is a Puerto Rican former swimmer who competed in the 1976 Summer Olympics.  He competed for Harvard College, after graduating from Colegio San Ignacio de Loyola (San Juan).

References

1957 births
Living people
Colegio San Ignacio de Loyola alumni
Puerto Rican male swimmers
Puerto Rican male freestyle swimmers
Olympic swimmers of Puerto Rico
Swimmers at the 1976 Summer Olympics
Harvard Crimson men's swimmers
Harvard College alumni
20th-century Puerto Rican people
21st-century Puerto Rican people